Lloyd George Folkins (February 24, 1913 – September 7, 1994) was a Canadian politician. He served in the Legislative Assembly of New Brunswick from 1974 to 1982 as a member of the Progressive Conservative party from the constituency of Tantramar.

In 1996, Squire Street in Sackville, NB was renamed Folkins Drive in honour of Lloyd G. Folkins, former mayor and MLA for Tantramar.

References

1913 births
1994 deaths